George DeTitta may refer to:

 George DeTitta Sr., set decorator
 George DeTitta Jr., set decorator, son of the above